Polygonatum biflorum (smooth Solomon's-seal, great Solomon's-seal, Solomon's seal) is an  herbaceous flowering plant native to eastern and central North America.  The plant is said to possess scars on the rhizome that resemble the ancient Hebrew seal of King Solomon. It is often confused with Solomon's plume, which has upright flowers.

Description
Leaves are  simple and alternate with prominent, parallel veins. Between March and June, clusters of small white-green flowers droop from the stalks and later produce small blue berries. If dug up, the scars resembling Solomon's Seal may be visible on the nodes between sections of rhizomes. It is found in rich or rocky woods and along streambanks. It prefers shade to partial shade and medium to wet soil with high humus content, but can do well in a variety of conditions.

Taxonomy
The species name biflorum is the neuter form of Latin , meaning "having two flowers". Despite the name, the flower clusters often have more than two flowers.

P. biflorum is now regarded as including a number of other species and varieties, e.g. P. biflorum var. commutatum or P. commutatum.

Uses
Historically, the Native Americans consumed the starch-rich rhizomes of smooth Solomon's-seal as a "potato-like food" used to make breads and soups. The young shoots are also edible, raw or boiled for an asparagus-like food. Smooth Solomon's-seal was also used in herbal medicine. For example, the rhizome was used in making a tonic for gout and rheumatism. Smooth Solomon's-seal has had nearly a dozen uses in herbal medicine including as an anti-inflammatory, sedative, and tonic. Smooth Solomon's-seal is not used in large-scale agriculture.

References

External links
USDA Plants Profile for Polygonatum biflorum (smooth Solomon's seal)
Connecticut Botanical Society: Polygonatum biflorum

biflorum
Flora of Eastern Canada
Flora of the Eastern United States
Flora of the Appalachian Mountains
Flora of the Great Lakes region (North America)
Flora of the Great Plains (North America)
Flora of the North-Central United States
Flora of the South-Central United States
Flora of the Northeastern United States
Flora of the Southeastern United States
Flora of Alberta
Flora of Michigan
Flora of New Mexico
Flora of Virginia
Flora of Wyoming
Plants described in 1788
Medicinal plants of North America
Plants used in traditional Native American medicine
Plants used in Native American cuisine
Garden plants of North America